In 2017 in Burkina Faso, 52% of girls are married before the age of 18 years. 10% are married before they turn 15. Burkina Faso has the fifth-highest national rate in the world for child marriage.

References 

Burkina Faso
Childhood in Africa
Society of Burkina Faso
Marriage in Africa